The Bhutan Olympic Committee (BOC) was created on 23 November 1983 with the 4th King of Bhutan as its President, with its headquarters at Thimphu, Bhutan. Following this recognition, Bhutan participated for the first time in the 1984 Olympic Games held in Los Angeles when three men and three women archers represented Bhutan.

The Bhutan Olympic Committee is one of only 205 National Olympic Committees created by the Olympic Organization. National Olympic Committee (NOC) is created in each country of the world. NOC is one of the three constituents of the Olympic Movement together with the International Olympic Committee (IOC) and International Sport Federations. The objective of the NOC is to “develop, promote and protect the Olympic Movement in the country...”

Membership
Apart from the International Olympic Committee (IOC), Bhutan is also a member of Association of National Olympic Committees (ANOC), Paris and Olympic Council of Asia (OCA), Kuwait. Affiliated sports federations of Bhutan are the Bhutan Amateur Athletic Federation, Bhutan Boxing Federation, Bhutan Football Federation, Bhutan Table Tennis Federation and Bhutan Tennis Federation, all located in Thimphu.

In July 2003, the Department for Youth, Culture & Sports was established under the aegis of the Ministry of Education, Government of Bhutan, with the objective to develop “a holistic approach and policy for sports and social development. Bhutan”. Bhutan now has 14 sports federations in which 100,000 (amateur) sports practitioners are members.

Bhutan and the Netherlands have been involved in an active cooperation programme since 2001. Under this programme, archery, a national sport in Bhutan, is receiving a countrywide boost. The intention is towards the Olympic Games of 2012 to achieve status of Bhutan as one of the leading countries in Olympic archery. The bilateral cooperation has resulted in publication of a book, in 2004, on traditional and modern archery in Bhutan and the Netherlands, and a documentary film on Bhutan Olympic Archery to be screened in Germany and international channels. Similar cooperation has been extended to football by the Royal Netherlands Football Association (KNVB)  In 2004 the Bhutan Archery Federation was honored with a Prince Claus Award from the Netherlands.

History
After the formation of the Bhutan Olympic Committee on 23 November 1983, they participated in the archery event of the Olympic Games 1984 held in Los Angeles. Six archers from Bhutan, three men and three women, participated in the event. Since then Bhutan has participated in the Summer Games held in the 1988, 1992, 1996, 2000, 2004 and 2008. Bhutan has also participated in the 2010 Youth Olympics

Tshering Chhoden along with veteran archer Jubzang participated in the 2000 Summer Olympics held in Sydney.

In the 2004 Games held in Athens, which marked the return of the games to the location of the first modern Olympics, two archers, Tshering Choden and Tashi Peljor (second participation), represented Bhutan. They reached the second round of the qualifying round for the first time. Two student athletes, Kunzang Chhoden and Sonam Tobgay also were part of this team as archers selected for the Olympic Youth Camp.

Sports

For each Olympic Summer Games since 1984, Bhutan has fielded male and female archers. Archery is the national sport of Bhutan. They have never competed in the Winter Games or the other events of the Summer Games; they also have not yet won an Olympic medal.

While archery is the national sport of Bhutan and the only sport in which it participates in the Olympics, other popular sports in the country are tug of war, basketball, football and cricket. Adventure sports such as trekking, rafting, mountain biking and rock climbing are also popular.

Archery is very popular throughout Bhutan — each village has an archery range. However, until recently its equipment base was traditional (hand-carved bamboo bows); these have now been replaced by modern and high-tech equipment for international games.

Documentary
A documentary film known as “The Other Final” was filmed based on a special football match arranged by Fédération Internationale de Football Association (FIFA) that was played between the 202nd placed (out of 203 worldwide) Bhutan and 203rd-ranked Montserrat.

See also
Bhutan at the Olympics

References

External links
Official website

Bhutan
Oly
Bhutan at the Olympics
1983 establishments in Bhutan
Sports organizations established in 1983